Tsotsi is the only novel written by South African playwright Athol Fugard (born 1932). It was published in 1980 although written some time earlier, and it was the basis of the 2005 film of the same name. It has been republished in several editions including in 2019 by Canongate.

In 2022 it was selected as one of the 70 books in the Big Jubilee Read, a celebration of writing by Commonwealth writers for the Platinum Jubilee of Elizabeth II.

References

Further reading
 

1980 novels
South African novels adapted into films